As You Like It is a pastoral comedy by William Shakespeare believed to have been written in 1599 and first published in the First Folio in 1623. The play's first performance is uncertain, though a performance at Wilton House in 1603 has been suggested as a possibility.

As You Like It follows its heroine Rosalind as she flees persecution in her uncle's court, accompanied by her cousin Celia to find safety and, eventually, love, in the Forest of Arden. In the forest, they encounter a variety of memorable characters, notably the melancholy traveller Jaques, who speaks many of Shakespeare's most famous speeches (such as "All the world's a stage", "too much of a good thing" and "A fool! A fool! I met a fool in the forest"). Jaques provides a sharp contrast to the other characters in the play, always observing and disputing the hardships of life in the country.

Historically, critical response has varied, with some critics finding the play a work of great merit and some finding it to be of lesser quality than other Shakespearean works. The play has been adapted for radio, film, and musical theatre.

Characters

Main characters:

Court of Duke Frederick:
 Duke Frederick, Duke Senior's younger brother and his usurper, also Celia's father
 Rosalind, Duke Senior's daughter
 Celia, Duke Frederick's daughter and Rosalind's cousin
 Touchstone, a court fool or jester
 Le Beau, a courtier
 Charles, a wrestler
 Lords and ladies in Duke Frederick's court

Household of the deceased Sir Rowland de Boys:
 Oliver de Boys, the eldest son and heir
 Jacques de Boys, the second son, announces Frederick's change of heart
 Orlando de Boys, the youngest son
 Adam, a faithful old servant who follows Orlando into exile
 Dennis, the servant who announces Charles's arrival in Oliver's orchard

Exiled court of Duke Senior in the Forest of Arden:
 Duke Senior, Duke Frederick's older brother and Rosalind's father
 Jaques, a discontented, melancholic lord
 Amiens, an attending lord and musician
 Lords in Duke Senior's forest court

Country folk in the Forest of Arden:
 Phebe, a proud shepherdess
 Silvius, a shepherd
 Audrey, a country girl
 Corin, an elderly shepherd
 William, a country man
 Sir Oliver Martext, a curate

Other characters:
 Hymen, officiates over the weddings in the end; god of marriage, as appearing in a masque
 Pages and musicians

Synopsis 

The play is set in a duchy in France, but most of the action takes place in a location called the Forest of Arden. This may be intended as the Ardennes, a forested region covering an area located in southeast Belgium, western Luxembourg and northeastern France, or Arden, Warwickshire, near Shakespeare's home town, which was the ancestral origin of his mother's family—whose surname was Arden.

Frederick has usurped the duchy and exiled his older brother, Duke Senior. Duke Senior's daughter, Rosalind, has been permitted to remain at court because she is the closest friend of Frederick's only child, Celia. Orlando, a young gentleman of the kingdom who at first sight has fallen in love with Rosalind, is forced to flee his home after being persecuted by his older brother, Oliver. Frederick becomes angry and banishes Rosalind from court. Celia and Rosalind decide to flee together accompanied by the court fool, Touchstone, with Rosalind disguised as a young man and Celia disguised as a poor lady.

Rosalind, now disguised as Ganymede ("Jove's own page"), and Celia, now disguised as Aliena (Latin for "stranger"), arrive in the Arcadian Forest of Arden, where the exiled Duke now lives with some supporters, including "the melancholy Jaques", a malcontent figure, who is introduced weeping over the slaughter of a deer. "Ganymede" and "Aliena" do not immediately encounter the Duke and his companions. Instead, they meet Corin, an impoverished tenant, and offer to buy his master's crude cottage.

Orlando and his servant Adam, meanwhile, find the Duke and his men and are soon living with them and posting simplistic love poems for Rosalind on the trees. It has been said that the role of Adam was played by Shakespeare, though this story is also said to be without foundation. Rosalind, also in love with Orlando, meets him as Ganymede and pretends to counsel him to cure him of being in love. Ganymede says that "he" will take Rosalind's place and that "he" and Orlando can act out their relationship.

The shepherdess, Phebe, with whom Silvius is in love, has fallen in love with Ganymede (Rosalind in disguise), though "Ganymede" continually shows that "he" is not interested in Phebe. Touchstone, meanwhile, has fallen in love with the dull-witted shepherdess Audrey, and tries to woo her, but eventually is forced to be married first. William, another shepherd, attempts to marry Audrey as well, but is stopped by Touchstone, who threatens to kill him "a hundred and fifty ways".

Finally, Silvius, Phebe, Ganymede, and Orlando are brought together in an argument with each other over who will get whom. Ganymede says he will solve the problem, having Orlando promise to marry Rosalind, and Phebe promise to marry Silvius if she cannot marry Ganymede.

Orlando sees Oliver in the forest and rescues him from a lioness, causing Oliver to repent for mistreating Orlando. Oliver meets Aliena (Celia's false identity) and falls in love with her, and they agree to marry. Orlando and Rosalind, Oliver and Celia, Silvius and Phebe, and Touchstone and Audrey are all married in the final scene, after which they discover that Frederick has also repented his faults, deciding to restore his legitimate brother to the dukedom and adopt a religious life. Jaques, ever melancholic, declines their invitation to return to the court, preferring to stay in the forest and to adopt a religious life as well. Finally Rosalind speaks an epilogue, commending the play to both men and women in the audience.

Date and text 
The direct and immediate source of As You Like It is Thomas Lodge's Rosalynde, Euphues Golden Legacie, written 1586–87 and first published in 1590. Lodge's story is based upon "The Tale of Gamelyn".

As You Like It was first printed in the collected edition of Shakespeare's plays, known as the First Folio, during 1623. No copy of it in Quarto exists, for the play is mentioned by the printers of the First Folio among those which "are not formerly entered to other men". By means of evidences, external and internal, the date of composition of the play has been approximately fixed at a period between the end of 1598 and the middle of 1599.

External evidence

As You Like It was entered into the Register of the Stationers' Company on 4 August 1600 as a work which was "to be stayed", i.e., not published till the Stationers' Company were satisfied that the publisher in whose name the work was entered was the undisputed owner of the copyright. Thomas Morley's First Book of Ayres, published in London in 1600 contains a musical setting for the song "It was a lover and his lass" from As You Like It. This evidence implies that the play was in existence in some shape or other before 1600.

It seems likely this play was written after 1598, since Francis Meres did not mention it in his Palladis Tamia. Although twelve plays are listed in Palladis Tamia, it was an incomplete inventory of Shakespeare's plays to that date (1598). The new Globe Theatre opened some time in the summer of 1599, and tradition has it that the new playhouse's motto was Totus mundus agit histrionem—"all the Globe's a stage"—an echo of Jaques' famous line "All the world's a stage" (II.7). This evidence posits September 1598 to September 1599 as the time frame within which the play was likely written.

Internal evidence

In act III, vi, Phebe refers to the famous line "Whoever loved that loved not at first sight" taken from Marlowe's Hero and Leander, which was published in 1598. This line, however, dates from 1593 when Marlowe was killed, and the poem was likely circulated in unfinished form before being completed by George Chapman. It is suggested in Michael Wood's In Search of Shakespeare that the words of Touchstone, "When a man's verses cannot be understood, nor a man's good wit seconded with the forward child understanding, it strikes a man more dead than a great reckoning in a little room", allude to Marlowe's assassination. According to the inquest into his death, Marlowe had been killed in a brawl following an argument over the "reckoning" of a bill in a room in a house in Deptford, owned by the widow Eleanor Bull in 1593. The 1598 posthumous publication of Hero and Leander would have revived interest in his work and the circumstances of his death. These words in act IV, i, in Rosalind's speech, "I will weep for nothing, like Diana in the fountain", may refer to an alabaster image of Diana which was set up in Cheapside in 1598. However, it should be remembered Diana is mentioned by Shakespeare in at least ten other plays, and is often depicted in myth and art as at her bath. Diana was a literary epithet for Queen Elizabeth I during her reign, along with Cynthia, Phoebe, Astraea, and the Virgin Mary. Certain anachronisms exist as well, such as the minor character Sir Oliver Martext's possible reference to the Marprelate Controversy which transpired between 1588 and 1589. On the basis of these references, it seems that As You Like It may have been composed in 1599–1600, but it remains impossible to say with any certainty.

Analysis and criticism 

Though the play is consistently one of Shakespeare's most frequently performed comedies, scholars have long disputed over its merits. George Bernard Shaw complained that As You Like It is lacking in the high artistry of which Shakespeare was capable. Shaw liked to think that Shakespeare wrote the play as a mere crowdpleaser, and signalled his own middling opinion of the work by calling it As You Like It—as if the playwright did not agree. Tolstoy objected to the immorality of the characters and Touchstone's constant clowning. Other critics have found great literary value in the work. Harold Bloom has written that Rosalind is among Shakespeare's greatest and most fully realised female characters.

The elaborate gender reversals in the story are of particular interest to modern critics interested in gender studies. Through four acts of the play, Rosalind, who in Shakespeare's day would have been played by a boy, finds it necessary to disguise herself as a boy, whereupon the rustic Phebe, also played by a boy, becomes infatuated with this "Ganymede", a name with homoerotic overtones. In fact, the epilogue, spoken by Rosalind to the audience, states rather explicitly that she (or at least the actor playing her) is not a woman. In several scenes, "Ganymede" impersonates Rosalind so a boy actor would have been playing a girl disguised as a boy impersonating a girl.

Setting 

Arden is the name of a forest located close to Shakespeare's home town of Stratford-upon-Avon, but Shakespeare probably had in mind the French Arden Wood, featured in Orlando Innamorato, especially since the two Orlando epics, Orlando Innamorato and Orlando Furioso, have other connections with the play. In the Orlando mythos, Arden Wood is the location of Merlin's Fountain, a magic fountain causing anyone who drinks from it to fall out of love. The Oxford Shakespeare edition rationalises the confusion between the two Ardens by assuming that "Arden" is an anglicisation of the forested Ardennes region of France, where Lodge set his tale, and alters the spelling to reflect this. Other editions keep Shakespeare's "Arden" spelling, since it can be argued that the pastoral mode depicts a fantastical world in which geographical details are irrelevant. The Arden edition of Shakespeare makes the suggestion that the name "Arden" comes from a combination of the classical region of Arcadia and the biblical garden of Eden, as there is a strong interplay of classical and Christian belief systems and philosophies within the play. Arden was also the maiden name of Shakespeare's mother and her family home is located within the Forest of Arden.

Themes

Love

Love is the central theme of As You Like It, like other romantic comedies of Shakespeare. Following the tradition of a romantic comedy, As You Like It is a tale of love manifested in its varied forms. In many of the love-stories, it is love at first sight. This principle of "love at first sight" is seen in the love-stories of Rosalind and Orlando, Celia and Oliver, as well as Phebe and Ganymede. The love-story of Audrey and Touchstone is a parody of romantic love. Another form of love is between women, as in Rosalind and Celia's deep bond.

Gender 
Gender poses as one of the play's integral themes. While disguised as Ganymede, Rosalind also presents a calculated perception of affection that is "disruptive of [the] social norms" and "independent of conventional gender signs" that dictate women's behavior as irrational. In her book As She Likes It: Shakespeare's Unruly Women, Penny Gay analyzes Rosalind's character in the framework of these gender conventions that ascribe femininity with qualities such as "graciousness, warmth ... [and] tenderness". However, Rosalind's demanding tone in her expression of emotions towards Orlando contradicts these conventions. Her disobedience to these features of femininity proves a "deconstruction of gender roles", since Rosalind believes that "the wiser [the woman is], the waywarder" she is. By claiming that women who are wild are smarter than those who are not, Rosalind refutes the perception of women as passive in their pursuit of men.

Usurpation and injustice
Usurpation and injustice are significant themes of this play. The new Duke Frederick usurps his older brother Duke Senior, while Oliver parallels this behavior by treating his younger brother Orlando so ungenerously as to compel him to seek his fortune elsewhere. Both Duke Senior and Orlando take refuge in the forest, where justice is restored "through nature".

Forgiveness

The play highlights the theme of usurpation and injustice on the property of others. However, it ends happily with reconciliation and forgiveness. Duke Frederick is converted by a hermit and he restores the dukedom to Duke Senior who, in his turn, restores the forest to the deer. Oliver also undergoes a change of heart and learns to love Orlando. Thus, the play ends on a note of rejoicing and merry-making.

Court life and country life

Most of the play is a celebration of life in the country. The inhabitants of Duke Frederick's court suffer the perils of arbitrary injustice and even threats of death; the courtiers who followed the old duke into forced exile in the "desert city" of the forest are, by contrast, experiencing liberty but at the expense of some easily borne discomfort. (Act II, i). A passage between Touchstone, the court jester, and shepherd Corin establishes the contentment to be found in country life, compared with the perfumed, mannered life at court. (Act III, I). At the end of the play the usurping duke and the exiled courtier Jaques both elect to remain within the forest.

Envy

In this play, the universal globe, inhabited by ordinary mortals, is shown at the end as the audience liked it: happy and reconciled by love. However, the text can be seen as a pretext. “This wide and universal theatre present more woeful pageants” (II, vii, 137–138). The comedy in fact establishes a respite from the so-called War Stage. “Are not these woods more free from peril than the envious court?” (II, i, 3–4).

From Oliver’s description (IV, iii, 98–120), a golden green snake is instead seen by Orlando threateningly approaching the open mouth of “a wretched ragged man”, tightening around his neck, “but suddenly seeing Orlando, it unlinked itself and with glides did slip away into a bush” (IV, iii, 106, 110–113). It can be deduced that with the appearance of the actor on stage, envy suddenly disappears. He who had fought like a Hercules, a hero not by chance invoked by Rosalind (“Now Hercules be thy speed”, I, ii, 204–210), just before the challenge with “Charles, the wrestler”, in allusion to the figure of the insign of Globe Theatre, which accompanied the presumed inscription: "Totus Mundus Agit Histrionem".

Religious allegory 

University of Wisconsin professor Richard Knowles, the editor of the 1977 New Variorum edition of this play, in his article "Myth and Type in As You Like It", pointed out that the play contains mythological references in particular to Eden and to Hercules.

Music and songs

As You Like It is known as a musical comedy because of the number of songs in the play. There are more songs in it than in any other play of Shakespeare. These songs and music are incorporated in the action that takes place in the forest of Arden, as shown below:
 "Under the Greenwood tree": It summarises the views of Duke Senior on the advantages of country life over the amenities of the court. Amiens sings this song.
 "Blow, blow, thou winter wind": This song is sung by Amiens. It states that physical suffering caused by frost and winter winds is preferable to the inner suffering caused by man's ingratitude.
 "What shall he have that killed the deer": It is another song which adds a lively spectacle and some forest-colouring to contrast with love-talk in the adjoining scenes. it highlights the pastoral atmosphere.
 "It was a lover and his lass": It serves as a prelude to the wedding ceremony. It praises spring time and is intended to announce the rebirth of nature and the theme of moral regeneration in human life. Thomas Morley is known to have set the lyrics of this song to music in the form of a lute song.

Language

Use of prose
Shakespeare uses prose for about 55% of the text, with the remainder in verse. Shaw affirms that as used here the prose, "brief [and] sure", drives the meaning and is part of the play's appeal, whereas some of its verse he regards only as ornament. The dramatic convention of the time required the courtly characters to use verse, and the country characters prose, but in As You Like It this convention is deliberately overturned. For example, Rosalind, although the daughter of a Duke and thinking and behaving in high poetic style, actually speaks in prose as this is the "natural and suitable" way of expressing the directness of her character, and the love scenes between Rosalind and Orlando are in prose (III, ii, 277). In a deliberate contrast, Silvius describes his love for Phebe in verse (II, iv, 20). As a mood of a character changes, he or she may change from one form of expression to the other in mid-scene. In a metafictional touch, Jaques cuts off a prose dialogue with Rosalind because Orlando enters, using verse: "Nay then, God be wi' you, an you talk in blank verse" (IV, i, 29). The defiance of convention is continued when the epilogue is given in prose.

All the world's a stage

Act II, scene VII, features one of Shakespeare's most famous monologues, spoken by Jaques, which begins:
All the world's a stage
And all the men and women merely players;
They have their exits and their entrances,
And one man in his time plays many parts
The arresting imagery and figures of speech in the monologue develop the central metaphor: a person's lifespan is a play in seven acts. These acts, or "seven ages", begin with "the infant/Mewling and puking in the nurse's arms" and work through six further vivid verbal sketches, culminating in "second childishness and mere oblivion,/Sans teeth, sans eyes, sans taste, sans everything".

Pastoral mode 

The main theme of pastoral comedy is love in all its guises in a rustic setting, the genuine love embodied by Rosalind contrasted with the sentimentalised affectations of Orlando, and the improbable happenings that set the urban courtiers wandering to find exile, solace or freedom in a woodland setting are no more unrealistic than the string of chance encounters in the forest which provoke witty banter and which require no subtleties of plotting and character development. The main action of the first act is no more than a wrestling match, and the action throughout is often interrupted by a song. At the end, Hymen himself arrives to bless the wedding festivities.

William Shakespeare's play As You Like It clearly falls into the Pastoral Romance genre; but Shakespeare does not merely use the genre, he develops it. Shakespeare also used the Pastoral genre in As You Like It to 'cast a critical eye on social practices that produce injustice and unhappiness, and to make fun of anti-social, foolish and self-destructive behaviour', most obviously through the theme of love, culminating in a rejection of the notion of the traditional Petrarchan lovers.

The stock characters in conventional situations were familiar material for Shakespeare and his audience; it is the light repartee and the breadth of the subjects that provide opportunities for wit that put a fresh stamp on the proceedings. At the centre the optimism of Rosalind is contrasted with the misogynistic melancholy of Jaques. Shakespeare would take up some of the themes more seriously later: the usurper Duke and the Duke in exile provide themes for Measure for Measure and The Tempest.

The play, turning upon chance encounters in the forest and several entangled love affairs in a serene pastoral setting, has been found, by many directors, to be especially effective staged outdoors in a park or similar site.

Performance history 

There is no certain record of any performance before the Restoration. Evidence suggests that the premiere may have taken place at Richmond Palace on 20 Feb 1599, enacted by the Lord Chamberlain's Men. Another performance may possibly have taken place at Wilton House in Wiltshire, the country seat of the Earls of Pembroke. William Herbert, 3rd Earl of Pembroke hosted James I and his Court at Wilton House from October to December 1603, while Jacobean London was suffering an epidemic of bubonic plague. The King's Men were paid £30 to come to Wilton House and perform for the King and Court on 2 December 1603. A Herbert family tradition holds that the play acted that night was As You Like It.

During the English Restoration, the King's Company was assigned the play by royal warrant in 1669. It is known to have been acted at Drury Lane in 1723, in an adapted form called Love in a Forest; Colley Cibber played Jaques. Another Drury Lane production seventeen years later returned to the Shakespearean text (1740).

Notable recent productions of As You Like It include the 1936 Old Vic Theatre production starring Edith Evans and the 1961 Shakespeare Memorial Theatre production starring Vanessa Redgrave. The longest-running Broadway production starred Katharine Hepburn as Rosalind, Cloris Leachman as Celia, William Prince as Orlando, and Ernest Thesiger as Jaques, and was directed by Michael Benthall. It ran for 145 performances in 1950. Another notable production was at the 2005 Stratford Festival in Stratford, Ontario, which was set in the 1960s and featured Shakespeare's lyrics set to music written by Barenaked Ladies. In 2014, theatre critic Michael Billington said his favourite production of the play was Cheek by Jowl's 1991 production, directed by Declan Donnellan.

Adaptations

Music 

Thomas Morley composed music for "It was a lover and his lass"; he lived in the same parish as Shakespeare, and at times composed music for Shakespeare's plays.

Roger Quilter set "Blow, Blow, Thou Winter Wind" for voice and piano (1905) in his 3 Shakespeare songs Op. 6

Florence Wickham wrote the music and lyrics for her opera Rosalind, based on As You Like It, which premiered at the open air Rockridge Theater in Carmel, New York, in August 1938.

In 1942, Gerald Finzi included a setting of "It was a lover and his lass" (V, iii) in his song cycle on Shakespearean texts Let Us Garlands Bring.

Cleo Laine sang a jazz setting of "It was a lover and his lass" on her 1964 album "Shakespeare... and all that Jazz". The composer is credited as "Young".

Donovan set "Under the Greenwood Tree" to music and recorded it for A Gift from a Flower to a Garden in 1968.

Hans Werner Henze, in the first part of his sonata Royal Winter Music, which portraits Shakespearean characters, included "Touchstone, Audrey and William" as its 5th movement, in 1976.

John Rutter composed a setting of "Blow, Blow, Thou Winter Wind" for chorus in 1992.

In 2005 The Barenaked Ladies wrote and released a full album for the play. It was recorded for and exclusively released at the Stratford Shakespeare Festival.

Michael John Trotta composed a setting of "Blow, Blow, Thou Winter Wind" for choir in 2013.

Rush's drummer and composer Neil Peart incorporated the passage “All the world’s indeed a stage / And we are merely players / Performers and portrayers / Each another’s audience / Outside the gilded cage” into the lyrics for "Limelight" from their 1981 progressive rock album Moving Pictures.

Radio 

On 1 March 2015, BBC Radio 3 broadcast a new production directed by Sally Avens with music composed by actor and singer Johnny Flynn of the folk rock band Johnny Flynn and The Sussex Wit. The production included Pippa Nixon as Rosalind, Luke Norris as Orlando, Adrian Scarborough as Touchstone, William Houston as Jaques, Ellie Kendrick as Celia and Jude Akuwudike as Corin.

Film 

As You Like It was Laurence Olivier's first Shakespeare film. Olivier, however, served only in an acting capacity (performing the role of Orlando), rather than producing or directing the film. J.M. Barrie, author of Peter Pan, wrote the treatment. Made in England and released in 1936, As You Like It also starred director Paul Czinner's wife Elisabeth Bergner, who played Rosalind with a thick German accent. Although it is much less "Hollywoody" than the versions of A Midsummer Night's Dream and Romeo and Juliet made at about the same time, and although its cast was made up entirely of Shakespearean actors, it was not considered a success by either Olivier or the critics. Still, it's a visual delight with eccentric characters in an enchanting forest rife with animals: sheep, goats, peacocks, storks, a huge snake and skulking lioness.

Helen Mirren starred as Rosalind in the 1978 BBC videotaped version of As You Like It, directed by Basil Coleman.

In 1992, Christine Edzard made another film adaptation of the play. It features James Fox, Cyril Cusack, Andrew Tiernan, Griff Rhys Jones, and Ewen Bremner. The action is transposed to a modern and bleak urban world.

A film version of As You Like It, set in 19th-century Japan, was released in 2006, directed by Kenneth Branagh. It stars Bryce Dallas Howard, David Oyelowo, Romola Garai, Alfred Molina, Kevin Kline, and Brian Blessed. Although it was actually made for cinemas, it was released to theatres only in Europe, and had its U.S. premiere on HBO in 2007. Although it was not a made-for-television film, Kevin Kline won a Screen Actors Guild award for Best Performance by a Male Actor in a Television Movie or Miniseries for his performance as Jaques.

Other musical work
The Seven Doors of Danny, by Ricky Horscraft and John McCullough is based on the "Seven Ages of Man" element of the "All the world's a stage" speech and was premiered in April 2016.

References 

Sources

External links 

 
 
 Modern translation
 
 
 MaximumEdge.com – scene-indexed, searchable version of the play
 As You Like It, edited by David Bevington, as well as original-spelling texts, facsimiles of the 1623 Folio text, and other resources, internetshakespeare.uvic.ca, University of Victoria
 
 
 
 List of As You Like It movies, IMDb
 Lesson plans for As You Like It, varsitytutors.com
 "Variations on a Theme of Love"  introduction to the play and pastoral comedy as a genre
 Costume and set designs by the Motley Theatre Design Group for the 1949 production at The Old Vic and the 1957 production at the Royal Shakespeare Theatre

1599 plays
Cross-dressing in theatre
English Renaissance plays
Love stories
British plays adapted into films
Shakespearean comedies
Plays set in France
Ardennes in fiction
Forests in fiction
 
LGBT-related plays